Lee You Cheong (born January 12, 1986) is a South Korean male ballet dancer and actor.

Career

Performance/Play

 "The Sleeping Beauty" by Guest in Korea National Ballet (2005)
 "Opera A Masked Ball" (2005)
 "Opera The Elixir of Love" (2007)
 "Chicago Dance Festival" (2008~2009)
 "New York Midpoint project" (2011)
 "New York Broadway Dance Show" (2011)

Musical theater in Korea

 "Musical Notre-Dame de Paris" (2009.8~9)
 "Musical Elisabeth" (2012.2~5)
 "Musical Hero" (2012.10~11)
 "Musical Joseph and the Amazing Technicolor Dreamcoat" (2013.2~4)
 "Musical Notre-Dame de Paris"  (2013.9~12)
 "Musical Frankenstein" (2014)

Television Shows in Korea

 2011.1.17 tvN "Love Switch"
 2013.5.3 KBS "Music Bank" Show of Younha - The Reason We Broke Up
 2013.5.9 Mnet "M Countdown" Show of Younha - The Reason We Broke Up
 2013.5.11 MBC "Music Core" Show of Younha - The Reason We Broke Up

Etc.

 2013 Music Video of Younha - The Reason We Broke Up

References

External links
 

1986 births
Living people
South Korean male musical theatre actors
South Korean male ballet dancers
21st-century South Korean male actors